Abdullah Mokoginta (5 May 1935 – 16 August 2021) was an Indonesian politician. A member of Golkar, he served as Deputy Governor of North Sulawesi from 1986 to 1991 and in the People's Representative Council from 1992 to 1999.

Mokoginta was sworn in as the first Deputy Governor of North Sulawesi on 20 January 1986. Following his term, he was elected to serve in the People's Representative Council in 1992. He was re-elected in 1997 and served until 1999.

Abdullah Mokoginta died in Kotamobagu on 16 August 2021 at the age of 86.

References

1935 births
2021 deaths
Golkar politicians
People from North Sulawesi
Members of the People's Representative Council, 1992
Members of the People's Representative Council, 1997